The 1951–52 Iowa Hawkeyes men's basketball team represented the University of Iowa in intercollegiate basketball during the 1951–52 season. The team was led by first-year head coach Bucky O'Connor and played their home games at the Iowa Field House. The Hawkeyes finished the season with a 19–3 record (11–3 in Big Ten) and in second place in the Big Ten standings.

Roster

Schedule/results

|-
!colspan=9 style=|Non-conference
|-

|-
!colspan=9 style=| Conference

Rankings

Honors and awards
Chuck Darling – Chicago Tribune Silver Basketball, Consensus First-team All-American

NBA draft

References

Iowa Hawkeyes men's basketball seasons
Iowa
Iowa Hawkeyes Men's Basketball Team
Iowa Hawkeyes Men's Basketball Team